Parliamentary elections were held in Tunisia on 4 November 1979, with a presidential election not required after Habib Bourguiba had been made President-for-life in 1975. At the time the country was a one-party state with the Socialist Destourian Party (PSD) as the sole legal party. Unlike previous elections, in which the PSD put forward a single list of candidates in each constituency, for this election there were multiple PSD candidates to choose from. Voter turnout was 80.55%.

Results

References

Tunisia
Elections in Tunisia
1979 in Tunisia
One-party elections
November 1979 events in Africa